West Lake is a freshwater lake in Hangzhou, China.

West Lake may also refer to:

Place names

Canada
West Lake, Ontario, a community
 West Lake, a bay of Lake Ontario, and the location of the community

China
Kunming Lake (Beijing), aka "West Lake", in the Summer Palace, Beijing
West Lake (Chaozhou), in Chaozhou, Guangdong
West Lake (Eryuan), in Eryuan County, Yunnan
West Lake, in Fuzhou, Fujian
West Lake (Huizhou), in Huizhou, Guangdong
West Lake, in Quanzhou, Fujian
West Lake Restaurant, in Changsha, Hunan

Japan
Saiko Lake ("West Lake"), in Yamanashi Prefecture

United States of America
West Lake Hills, Texas
West Lake Landfill, Bridgeton, Missouri
West Lake (New York), a lake in Fulton County, New York
West Lake (Herkimer County, New York), a lake
West Lake Sammamish, Washington, a community
West Lake Stevens, Washington, a community
West Lake Junior High, West Valley City, Utah

Vietnam
West Lake (Hanoi), the largest lake in Hanoi

Transit locations
West Lake station (MARTA), a passenger rail station in Atlanta, Georgia, United States
West Lake Corridor, a proposed commuter rail extension from Chicago, Illinois to Valparaiso, Indiana, United States
West Lake Station (disambiguation), stations of the name

See also
Westlake (disambiguation)

vi:Tây Hồ